Chewton is an unincorporated community and census-designated place (CDP) in Lawrence County, Pennsylvania, United States. The population was 488 at the 2010 census.

Geography
Chewton is located in southern Lawrence County at  (40.8976, -80.3184), in the northwestern part of Wayne Township. It sits on a bluff overlooking the east bank of the Beaver River. It is bordered across the river by the borough of Wampum.

Pennsylvania Route 288 passes through the southwestern side of the community, leading west across the Beaver River into Wampum and southeast  to Ellwood City.

Via the Beaver River, Chewton is part of the Ohio River watershed.

Demographics

References

Census-designated places in Lawrence County, Pennsylvania